Mohamed Abdelmonem El-Sayed Mohamed Ahmed (born 1 February 1999) is an Egyptian professional footballer who plays as a centre-back for Al Ahly and the Egypt national team. Abdelmonem featured in the final 2021 AFCON game against Senegal.

Career statistics

Club

International

Scores and results list Egypt's goal tally first, score column indicates score after each Abdelmonem goal.

Honours and achievements
Al Ahly
FIFA Club World Cup: Third-Place 2021

Awards 
 Africa Cup of Nations Dream Team: 2021

References

1999 births
Living people
People from Zagazig
Egyptian footballers
Association football defenders
Egypt international footballers
Egypt youth international footballers
2021 Africa Cup of Nations players
Egyptian Premier League players
Al Ahly SC players
Smouha SC players
Future FC (Egypt) players